Bothell West is a census-designated place (CDP) in Snohomish County, Washington, United States. The population was 16,607 at the 2010 census. Bothell West is one of several CDPs that were created out of the former North Creek CDP in 2010.

Bothell West, along with Bothell East, are recognized as part of unincorporated Bothell.

Geography
Bothell West is located at  (47.805218, -122.240703).

According to the United States Census Bureau, the CDP has a total area of 4.217 square miles (10.92 km), all of it land.

References 

Census-designated places in Washington (state)
Census-designated places in Snohomish County, Washington